HMDS may refer to:

 either of two related reagents in organometallic chemistry:
 Hexamethyldisilazane ([(CH3)3Si]2NH)
 Hexamethyldisilazide ([(CH3)3Si]2NM)
 M = Li as in Lithium bis(trimethylsilyl)amide (LiHMDS)
 M = Na as in Sodium bis(trimethylsilyl)amide (NaHMDS)
 M = K as in Potassium bis(trimethylsilyl)amide (KHMDS)
 Hexamethyldisiloxane (O[Si(CH3)3]2)
 Her Majesty's Diplomatic Service, of the United Kingdom
 Helmet mounted display and sight, a system for military pilots
 Harvest Moon DS, a video game